The badminton mixed doubles tournament at the 1998 Asian Games in Bangkok took place from 13 December to 17 December at Thammasat Gymnasium 2.

Schedule
All times are Indochina Time (UTC+07:00)

Results
Legend
WO — Won by walkover

Final

Top half

Bottom half

References
Results

Mixed doubles